Events from the year 1541 in India.

Events
 Bhoi Dynasty of Orissa established by Govinda Vidyadhara who serves as its first leader until 1549. The dynasty continues until 1881

Births
 July 12; 1541 – Shooryansi Somnath Bandyopadhyay, Chakraborty King Of Sandilya Gotra Bandyopadhyay Vanksha (d. 1648)

Deaths

See also

 Other events of 1541
 Timeline of Indian history

References